The Škoda 10 cm vz. 38 was a light howitzer deployed in single gun defensive casemates in the Czechoslovak border fortifications before World War II.

History 
The Škoda 10 cm vz. 38 was developed and built by Škoda at the Pilsen works.  Development of the howitzer began in March 1935 after an order was placed by the Czechoslovakian Department of National Defense.  The design was based on an existing field howitzer the 10 cm vz. 30.  The howitzer was put into production during 1938 and fifteen were completed and deployed in Czech border fortifications then under construction.  The howitzers  never saw action against the Germans being victims of the September 30th 1938 Munich Agreement which ceded the Sudetenland to Germany.  After World War II all fifteen howitzers were scrapped.  Today two wood and metal mock ups of the howitzers are housed in the museum of artillery at fort Dobrošov near Náchod.  The mock ups were acquired in 1973 from the museum of artillery at fort Hanicka and used as props in the filming of Days of betrayal by director Otakar Vavra.

References 

Howitzers
Artillery of Czechoslovakia
100 mm artillery